A juggernaut, in current English usage, is a literal or metaphorical force regarded as merciless, destructive, and unstoppable. This English usage originated in the mid-nineteenth century and was adapted from the Sanskrit word Jagannath.

Overview
The figurative use of the word is analogous to figurative uses of steamroller or battering ram to mean something overwhelming.  Its ground in social behavior is similar to that of bandwagon, but with overtones of devotional sacrifice.  Its British English meaning of a large heavy truck or articulated lorry dates from the second half of the twentieth century.

The English loanword juggernaut in the sense of "a huge wagon bearing an image of a Hindu god" is from the seventeenth century, inspired by  the Jagannatha Temple in Puri, Odisha (Orissa), which has the Ratha Yatra ("chariot procession"), an annual procession of chariots carrying the murtis (Deities) of Jagannātha, Subhadrā, and Balabhadra. 

The first European description of this festival is found in a thirteenth-century account by the Late Medieval Franciscan monk and missionary Odoric of Pordenone, who describes Hindus, as a religious sacrifice, casting themselves under the wheels of these huge chariots and being crushed to death. Odoric's description was later taken up and elaborated upon in the popular fourteenth-century Travels of John Mandeville. Others have suggested more prosaically that the deaths, if any, were accidental and caused by the press of the crowd and the general commotion.

Many speakers and writers apply the term to a large machine, or collectively to a team or group of people working together (such as a highly successful sports team or corporation), or even a growing political movement led by a charismatic leader—and it often bears an association with being crushingly destructive towards all obstacles.

The figurative sense of the English word, as a merciless, destructive, and unstoppable force, became common in the mid-nineteenth century. Mary Shelley used the term in her novel The Last Man, published in 1826, to describe the plague: "like Juggernaut, she proceeds crushing out the being of all who strew the high road of life". Charles Dickens used the term in The Life and Adventures of Martin Chuzzlewit, published in 1844, to describe the love-lorn sentiments of Mr. Augustus Moddle, the 'youngest gentleman' at Mrs. Todgers's: "He often informed Mrs. Togders that the sun had set upon him; that the billows had rolled over him; that the Car of Juggernaut had crushed him; and also that the deadly Upass tree of Java had blighted him." Robert Louis Stevenson used the term in The Strange Case of Dr. Jekyll and Mr. Hyde, published in 1886, when describing how the out-of-control character Hyde, after running into a child, 'trampled over her body like some damned Juggernaut'.

Other notable writers to have used the word this way range from H. G. Wells and Longfellow to Joe Klein. Bill Wilson in Twelve Steps and Twelve Traditions of Alcoholics Anonymous describes "self-sufficiency" in society at large as being a "bone-crushing juggernaut whose final achievement is ruin". To the contrary, Mark Twain (autobiography, vol 2), describes Juggernaut as the kindest of gods. Any pretensions to rank or caste do not exist within its temple.

Juggernaut (Cain Marko) is a fictional character appearing in American comic books published by Marvel Comics. Created by writer Stan Lee and artist/co-writer Jack Kirby, he first appeared in X-Men #12 (July 1965) as an adversary of the eponymous superhero team. He possesses superhuman strength and durability, and is virtually immune to most physical attacks; his helmet also protects him from mental attacks.

In the future wars depicted in John Shirley's Eclipse Trilogy, the contending armies use "Jaegernauts" - large rolling war machines that can destroy entire city blocks, high rises and other large buildings.

See also 
 Temple car
 Ratha

References

External links

Hindu festivals
Religious festivals in India